The 1997 Toledo Rockets football team was an American football team that represented the University of Toledo in the Mid-American Conference (MAC) during the 1997 NCAA Division I-A football season. In their seventh season under head coach Gary Pinkel, the Rockets compiled a 9–3 record (7–1 against MAC opponents), finished in first place in the MAC's West Division, lost to Marshall in the MAC Football Championship Game (14–34), and outscored all opponents by a combined total of 356 to 268.

The team's statistical leaders included Chris Wallace with 2,955 passing yards, Dwayne Harris with 1,278 rushing yards, and Brock Kreitzburg with 626 receiving yards.

Schedule

Roster

References

Toledo
Toledo Rockets football seasons
Toledo Rockets football